Yves Chauveau (born 14 April 1945 in Bourg-en-Bresse) is a French retired professional football goalkeeper.

External links

Profile on French federation official site
Profile

Sportspeople from Bourg-en-Bresse
1945 births
Living people
French footballers
France international footballers
Association football goalkeepers
Olympique Lyonnais players
AS Monaco FC players
Ligue 1 players
Ligue 2 players
FC Villefranche Beaujolais players
Footballers from Auvergne-Rhône-Alpes